Giorgia Sottana (born December 15, 1988) is an Italian basketball player for PF Schio and the Italian national team.

She participated at the EuroBasket Women 2017.

References

1988 births
Living people
Italian women's basketball players
Sportspeople from Treviso
Point guards
Fenerbahçe women's basketball players